The Dell Restaurant (now trading as the Serpentine Bar and Kitchen) is a Grade II* listed restaurant at the eastern end of the Serpentine in Hyde Park, London W1.

It was built in 1964 and designed by Patrick Gwynne.

References

Grade II* listed buildings in the City of Westminster
Restaurants in London
Restaurants established in 1964
1964 establishments in England